15 Años De Éxitos is the first greatest hits album (sixteenth overall) from Mexican singer Alejandro Fernández this album contains 15 successful tracks from 8 of his previous albums (Piel De Niña, Que Seas Muy Feliz, Muy Dentro de Mi Corazón, Me Estoy Enamorando, Mi Verdad, Orígenes, Niña Amada Mía and A Corazón Abierto) in addition to the newly recorded track "El Lado Oscuro Del Amor" from the Mexican film "El Búfalo De La Noche". The CD/DVD edition brings in addition to the CD with the 16 tracks, a DVD with 6 videos of Alejandro Fernández.

Track listing

CD

DVD
 Me Dediqué A Perderte (Video)
 Qué Voy A Hacer Con Mi Amor (Video)
 No Sé Olvidar (Video)
 Si Tú Supieras (Video)
 Niña Amada Mia (Video)
 Si Tu No Vuelves (Video)

Charts

Weekly charts

Year-end charts

References

Alejandro Fernández compilation albums
2007 greatest hits albums
2007 video albums
Music video compilation albums
Alejandro Fernández video albums
Spanish-language compilation albums
Sony Music compilation albums
Sony Music video albums
Spanish-language video albums